Dietrich Lohmann, B.V.K. (German Society of Cinematographers; 9 March 1943 – 13 November 1997) was a German cinematographer.

He was born in Schnepfenthal, Waltershausen, Thuringia, Germany. He studied at the Staatliche Fachschule für Optik und Fototechnik in Berlin. After graduating he entered Olympia-Film in Munich and worked with Thomas Mauch, and he became a key cinematographer of New German Cinema. He is prominent for his collaboration with director Rainer Werner Fassbinder.

He went to the US in 1988, and photographed Hollywood films such as The Innocent, Color of Night, A Couch in New York, The Peacemaker and Deep Impact.

He won at the German Film Awards in 1970, and at the American Society of Cinematographers Awards in 1989.

On November 13, 1997, Lohmann died from leukemia, aged 54.

The film Deep Impact was dedicated to Lohmann's memory.

Filmography 
Artists Under the Big Top: Perplexed (1968) camera assistant
Cardillac (1969)
Love Is Colder Than Death (1969)
Katzelmacher (1969)
Why Does Herr R. Run Amok? (1970)
The American Soldier (1970)
Rio das Mortes (1971)
 (1971)
The Merchant of Four Seasons (1971)
Eight Hours Don't Make a Day (1972–1973) TV series
Effi Briest (1972)
Ludwig: Requiem for a Virgin King (1972)
The Last Days of Gomorrah (1974, TV film)
Karl May (1974)
Hitler: A Film from Germany (1977)
Germany in Autumn (1978)
The Tailor from Ulm (1978)
Kassbach – Ein Porträt (1979)
Put on Ice (1980)
 The Confessions of Felix Krull (1982, TV series)
Tramps (1983)
Väter und Söhne – Eine deutsche Tragödie (1986)
The Great Escape II: The Untold Story (1988)
War and Remembrance (1989) TV miniseries, 1 episode
The Rose and the Jackal (1990) TV movie
Wedlock (1991)
Ted & Venus (1991) TV movie
Knight Moves (1992)
Salt on Our Skin (1992)
The Innocent (1993)
Me and the Kid (1993)
Color of Night (1994)
A Couch in New York (1996)
Snakes and Ladders (1996)
The Way We Are (1997) aka Quiet Days in Hollywood
The Peacemaker (1997)
Deep Impact (1998)

References

External links 

cinematographers.nl profile

German cinematographers
American cinematographers
Mass media people from Thuringia
German emigrants to the United States
Deaths from leukemia
Deaths from cancer in California
1943 births
1997 deaths